José Antonio Hernández Figueroa (born July 14, 1969) is a former Major League Baseball (MLB) infielder.

Career

Playing career 
In a 15-season career, Hernández had a .252 batting average with 159 home runs and 563 RBI in 1408 games. He was a 2002 All-Star Game reserve, and a member of the 1999 National League Champion Atlanta Braves.

Primarily a shortstop, Hernández played every position except pitcher.

In his All-Star year, Hernández hit 24 home runs with 73 RBI and a career-high .288 average; however, he also struck out 188 times, one shy of the MLB record. Then-Brewers manager Jerry Royster kept him out of the lineup in four of the last five games of the season so he would not break the dubious record. He led the majors in highest strikeout percentage (32.3%).

Hernández spent the entire 2004 season with the Los Angeles Dodgers in a utility role, hitting .289 (61-211) with 12 doubles, one triple, 13 home runs and 29 RBI in 95 games for the National League West champions. Hernández recorded 26 extra base hits and a .540 slugging percentage in just 211 at bats. Only Anaheim's Troy Glaus (207 AB, 18 HR) hit more home runs in the majors in 2004 among players with 215 or fewer at bats.

He played in 84 games and hit .231 with six home runs and 31 runs batted.

Before the  season, Hernández signed a minor league contract with the Pirates that included an invitation to spring training, and an opportunity to compete for a spot on the team. After playing only 67 games for Pittsburgh, the Phillies purchased his contract from the Pirates on August 22, 2006. He became a free agent after the season.

Hernández returned to the Pirates organization on January 3, . Unconditionally released on March 30, he signed with the Indianapolis Indians. In 99 games, he hit .242 with 13 home runs and 56 RBI.

Hernández set a Puerto Rican Winter League record with 20 home runs for Mayagüez during the - season.

Coaching career 
Hernández has been a field coach in the Baltimore Orioles organization since 2010. Beginning with the Gulf Coast League Orioles for one season, he was promoted to the Delmarva Shorebirds in 2011, the Frederick Keys in 2012 and the Norfolk Tides in 2013. He served as a field coach for the Norfolk Tides in 2018 for a sixth year. In January 2019, Hernández was promoted to the Major League staff in Baltimore with the title "Major League coach". On October 4, 2021, it was announced that Hernández would assume a different role on the Orioles' staff.

Personal life 
Hernández is the cousin of former Major League Baseball infielder Luis Figueroa and the son-in-law of Orlando Gómez, a former Major League Baseball coach and scout and minor league catcher and manager who, like Hernández, worked in the Orioles organization.

References

External links

1969 births
Living people
Atlanta Braves players
Baltimore Orioles coaches
Canton-Akron Indians players
Charlotte Rangers players
Chicago Cubs players
Cleveland Indians players
Colorado Rockies players
Gastonia Rangers players
Gulf Coast Rangers players
Indianapolis Indians players
Iowa Cubs players
Leones de Yucatán players
Los Angeles Dodgers players
Major League Baseball infielders
Major League Baseball outfielders
Major League Baseball players from Puerto Rico
Mexican League baseball infielders
Milwaukee Brewers players
Minor league baseball coaches
National League All-Stars
Oklahoma City 89ers players
Orlando Cubs players
Philadelphia Phillies players
Pittsburgh Pirates players
Puerto Rican expatriate baseball players in Mexico
Texas Rangers players
Tulsa Drillers players